Krobo Girls' Senior High School  is an all female second cycle institution in Odumasi Krobo in the Eastern Region of Ghana.

History

The School was founded in March 1927 by Scottish Missionaries.
Krobo Girls’ Senior High School was founded by female Scottish Missionaries in March 1927, as a Middle School for girls. A two-year teacher training college for women was added to the girls school in 1944 on experimental basis under the accelerated plan of the government.

The college was then constituted a Certificate B Teacher Training College for women in 1951 under the management of the Presbyterian Church of Ghana.

In 1962, the two-year teacher training college was changed to a four-year certificate A Teacher Training College for women and in September 1973, the Krobo Girls Middle School was phased out while the training college was converted to a girls secondary school, under the consolidation of Teacher Education Programme by the Ministry of Education.

Notable alumni
Docia Kisseih, nurse, midwife and educator

References

External links
 

High schools in Ghana
Girls' schools in Ghana
Educational institutions established in 1927
1927 establishments in Gold Coast (British colony)
Education in the Eastern Region (Ghana)